Events in the year 1884 in Germany.

Incumbents

National level
 Kaiser – William I
 Chancellor – Otto von Bismarck

State level

Kingdoms
 King of Bavaria – Ludwig II of Bavaria
 King of Prussia – Kaiser William I
 King of Saxony – Albert of Saxony
 King of Württemberg – Charles I of Württemberg

Grand Duchies
 Grand Duke of Baden – Frederick I
 Grand Duke of Hesse – Louis IV
 Grand Duke of Mecklenburg-Schwerin – Frederick Francis II
 Grand Duke of Mecklenburg-Strelitz – Frederick William
 Grand Duke of Oldenburg – Peter II
 Grand Duke of Saxe-Weimar-Eisenach – Charles Alexander

Principalities
 Schaumburg-Lippe – Adolf I, Prince of Schaumburg-Lippe
 Schwarzburg-Rudolstadt – George Albert, Prince of Schwarzburg-Rudolstadt
 Schwarzburg-Sondershausen – Charles Gonthier, Prince of Schwarzburg-Sondershausen
 Principality of Lippe – Woldemar, Prince of Lippe
 Reuss Elder Line – Heinrich XXII, Prince Reuss of Greiz
 Reuss Younger Line – Heinrich XIV, Prince Reuss Younger Line
 Waldeck and Pyrmont – George Victor, Prince of Waldeck and Pyrmont

Duchies
 Duke of Anhalt – Frederick I, Duke of Anhalt
 Duke of Brunswick – William, Duke of Brunswick to 18 October, then Duchy claimed by Prince Ernest Augustus, Duke of Cumberland, who was excluded and a temporary council of regency was established.
 Duke of Saxe-Altenburg – Ernst I, Duke of Saxe-Altenburg
 Duke of Saxe-Coburg and Gotha – Ernst II, Duke of Saxe-Coburg and Gotha
 Duke of Saxe-Meiningen – Georg II, Duke of Saxe-Meiningen

Colonial Governors
 Cameroon (Kamerun) from 14 July – Gustav Nachtigal (commissioner) to 19 July, then Maximilian Buchner (acting commissioner)
 German South-West Africa (Deutsch-Südwestafrika) from 24 April – Adolf Lüderitz (magistrate) to 7 October, then Gustav Nachtigal (commissioner)
 Togoland from 5 July – Gustav Nachtigal (commissioner) to 6 July October, then Heinrich Randad (provisional consul)

Events

 24 April – Territory in South West Africa is placed under German protection, becoming the first German colonial possession.
 9 June – The construction of the Reichstag building in Berlin started.
 5 July – German protectorate is first declared over part of Togoland.
 14 July – Commencement of German administration in Cameroon (Kamerun).
 28 October – German federal election, 1884
 15 November – The Berlin Conference which regulates European colonisation and trade in Africa begins (ends 26 February 1885).

Date unknown
 German company Glastechnisches Laboratorium Schott & Genossen was founded, later becoming Schott AG

Science 
 Germany got the second part of world's oldest national social health insurance system by legislation of Otto von Bismarck's social legislation, which included the Accicential Insurance Bill of 1884.
 Koch's postulates are four criteria designed to establish a causative relationship between a microbe and a disease. The postulates were formulated by Robert Koch and Friedrich Loeffler in 1884.
 Paal-Knorr Synthesis was initially reported independently by German chemists Carl Paal and Ludwig Knorr as a method for the preparation of furans
 Robert Koch resided and researched at Grant Medical College in Bombay, India, where he was able to determine the causative agent of cholera, isolating Vibrio cholerae.

Births

Deaths

References

 
Years of the 19th century in Germany